35th meridian may refer to:

35th meridian east, a line of longitude east of the Greenwich Meridian
35th meridian west, a line of longitude west of the Greenwich Meridian